Rawdon is a former township in the Canadian province of Nova Scotia. The township was the eventual destination of Loyalists fleeing the Siege of Ninety Six during the American Revolutionary War. In 1861, along with the township of Douglas, Nova Scotia, the Rawdon township became part of the newly-formed Municipal District of East Hants, along with neighbouring townships.

The township is the site of the present-day communities of Upper Rawdon, Centre Rawdon and South Rawdon, as well as Rawdon Gold Mines.

History

The first European settlers in the Rawdon Township, Nova Scotia were United Empire Loyalists who had to flee their homes in Ninety Six, South Carolina. They first went east, taking refuge behind British lines in Charleston. About 501 Rawdon loyalists, as well as members of the 2nd American Regiment, were relocated from South Carolina to Nova Scotia in 1782 after the American Revolution. 

They named their community after Francis Rawdon-Hastings, 1st Marquess of Hastings or "Lord Rawdon", who had rescued them from the 1781 Siege of Ninety-Six. The British had garrisoned a fort in this settlement because of its strategic location in western South Carolina, and as support for the many Loyalists in the area, most Scots-Irish immigrants. Stationed in Charleston after its fall, Lord Rawdon and his regiment, the Volunteers of Ireland (also known as The 2nd American Regiment), rescued the Rawdon Loyalists, who were severely outnumbered by about 1500 American Patriots. One of the most prominent Loyalists to survive the siege and settle in Rawdon was Captain John Bond, who was then part of the militia.

Some of the troops who assisted Lord Rawdon in the Siege of Ninety-Six were from the 84th Regiment of Foot (Royal Highland Emigrants), as well as the 2nd American Regiment.  After the American Revolution, many of the troops of the 84th Regiment and 2nd American Regiment settled in the neighbouring Township of Douglas (i.e., Kennetcook, Nova Scotia and the surrounding area). (The 1st and 2nd Battalions of De Lancey's Brigade fought successfully from within the fort until the siege was lifted by Rawdon. The soldiers of the De Lancey's Brigade settled Woodstock, New Brunswick.)

Abraham Cunard, the Loyalist merchant and father of shipping magnate Samuel Cunard, retired to the Cunards' country home in Rawdon. He is buried at the St. Paul's graveyard in Centre Rawdon.

In 1861, Rawdon Township became part of the newly-formed Municipal District of East Hants, along with neighbouring townships.

References

 Moss, Bobby G. The Loyalists in the Siege of Fort Ninety-Six (1999). South Carolina: Scotia-Hibernia Press (has been digitized by University of Wisconsin)
 Troxler, Carole W. "Origins of the Rawdon Loyalist Settlement," Nova Scotia Historical Review 8, 1 (1988): 62-76.
 Troxler, Carole W. "Community and Cohesion in the Rawdon Loyalist Settlement," Nova Scotia Historical Review 12 (June 1992): 40-66.

External links

Early Settlement of Rawdon - The East Hants Historical Society
Former populated places in Nova Scotia